Warrior Peak is a  double summit mountain located in Olympic National Park in Jefferson County of Washington state. Warrior is the 11th highest peak in the Olympic Mountains Range. The southeast summit is the slightly higher of the two summits, the northwest peak is estimated at 7285 feet elevation. Warrior Peak is easy to identify from Seattle, since it appears as the first prominent peak immediately north of Mount Constance, which is the dominant peak on the skyline. Warrior's nearest higher peak is in fact Mount Constance,  to the south-southeast. The first ascent of the mountain was made in 1945 by Fred Beckey, who solo climbed both summits, and named the mountain.

Climate

Based on the Köppen climate classification, Warrior Peak is located in the marine west coast climate zone of western North America. Most weather fronts originate in the Pacific Ocean, and travel northeast toward the Olympic Mountains. As fronts approach, they are forced upward by the peaks of the Olympic Range, causing them to drop their moisture in the form of rain or snowfall (Orographic lift). As a result, the Olympics experience high precipitation, especially during the winter months. During winter months, weather is usually cloudy, but, due to high pressure systems over the Pacific Ocean that intensify during summer months, there is often little or no cloud cover during the summer. Because of maritime influence, snow tends to be wet and heavy, resulting in avalanche danger. In terms of favorable weather, June to September are the best months for climbing the mountain. Precipitation runoff from the west side of the mountain drains into Home Creek, a tributary of the Dungeness River, whereas the east side drains into Tunnel Creek which is a tributary of the Big Quilcene River.

Geology

The Olympic Mountains are composed of obducted clastic wedge material and oceanic crust, primarily Eocene sandstone, turbidite, and basaltic oceanic crust. The mountains were sculpted during the Pleistocene era by erosion and glaciers advancing and retreating multiple times.

See also

 Olympic Mountains
 Geology of the Pacific Northwest
 Geography of Washington (state)

References

External links
 Warrior Peak weather: Mountain Forecast
 Warrior Peak climbing information The Mountaineers
 1975 Air Force C141 Crash: Historylink.org
 Aerial winter photo: Flickr

Olympic Mountains
Mountains of Jefferson County, Washington
Mountains of Washington (state)
Landforms of Olympic National Park
North American 2000 m summits